"La Cintura" (English: The Waist) is a song by Spanish-German singer-songwriter Álvaro Soler. It was released on 29 March 2018, as the lead single from his second studio album, Mar de Colores (2018). A "Latin Remix" featuring Flo Rida and TINI is included in the album as a bonus track. The song was written by Soler, Jakob Erixson, Nadir Khayat, Simon Triebel, and Ali Zuckowski, and produced by T.I. Jakke, RedOne, Zuckowski, and Rune Westberg, all of whom had previously worked on his number-one hit single "Sofia" (2016). The song became a European success, reaching the top 10 in Austria, Belgium, Germany, Italy, Poland, Spain, and Switzerland (number-one in Romandie, the French-speaking part of Switzerland).

Music video
The music video for "La Cintura" was released on Álvaro Soler's YouTube channel on 29 March 2018. Shot in Havana, Cuba, it features Soler and a group of people dancing around and having fun. As of May 2021, the video has over 187 million views.

A music video was also released for the remix featuring Flo Rida and TINI on July 26, 2018. Soler filmed scenes with Flo Rida in Miami while TINI filmed her scenes in Madrid. The remix music video has been seen over 123 million times as of March 2023.

Live performances
Álvaro performed the song at Gala 4 during the tenth season of Operación Triunfo (series 10) on October 17, 2018 along with the contestants.

Soler, Flo Rida, and TINI performed the song together at the 4th Annual Latin American Music Awards on October 25, 2018 at the Dolby Theatre in Los Angeles, California.

Track listings

Charts

Weekly charts

Year-end charts

Certifications

References

2018 singles
2018 songs
Spanish-language songs
Álvaro Soler songs
Songs written by Simon Triebel
Songs written by RedOne
Pop-folk songs
Songs written by Jakke Erixson
Songs written by Álvaro Soler